Tumachino (Tomansı) is a rural locality (a village) in Aptrakovsky Selsoviet, Meleuzovsky District, Bashkortostan, Russia. The population was 186 as of 2010. There are 4 streets.

Geography 
Tumachino is located 19 km southeast of Meleuz (the district's administrative centre) by road. Apasovo is the nearest rural locality.

References 

Rural localities in Meleuzovsky District